The Vektor CR-21 is a prototype South African assault rifle ("CR-21" being an abbreviation of Combat Rifle 21st Century) chambered for 5.56×45mm NATO ammunition. It was designed by Denel Land Systems as a possible replacement for the South African National Defence Force's current R4 assault rifle, however Denel Land Systems has since shifted focus to offering an upgraded R4 assault rifle to the SANDF instead.

The rifle is being marketed for export customers, but as of 2010 no sales had been achieved.

History
First unveiled in 1997, the rifle uses the bullpup layout. This enables the rifle to be as short as a typical carbine, whilst still retaining the muzzle velocity of longer assault rifles. However, this makes the CR-21 only capable of being fired from the right hand as the ejection port is located on the back right side of the rifle. The port can not be changed from side to side.

The rifle was adopted in limited numbers by the Peruvian army

Design
Internally, the CR-21 uses a slightly modified version of the Kalashnikov action found in the R4 assault rifle, which is known for its reliability and relatively low weight. The rifle also makes significant use of high-impact polymer, with the only exposed metal part on the rifle being the front of the barrel with its integral flash suppressor. Both of these result in the rifle having a low loaded weight, of 3.72 kg (8.2 lbs). 

The CR-21 comes standard with a 1× magnification optical sight with an illuminated reticle that does not require batteries. This sight is mounted on a sight rail, allowing easy removal and attachment, as well as the use of a range of different sight options. The forward handgrip has been specially designed to be easily removed and replaced with a grenade launcher similar to the M203 grenade launcher. Finally, the stock has a built-in compartment which stores a cleaning kit for the rifle, removing the usual need for the soldier to carry this separately.

A CR-21 carbine was said to have been developed by Vektor. Both of their 35-round magazines are based on those from the R4/Galil rifles.

Users 

 :Used by Parachute Commandos and Special Forces Brigade
 :Used by the Guardia Nacional Bolivariana and Comandos Rurales

See also

References
Notes

Weapons and ammunition introduced in 1997
5.56 mm assault rifles
Bullpup rifles
Carbines
Post–Cold War weapons of South Africa
Kalashnikov derivatives
Assault rifles of South Africa
Denel